The following is a timeline of the history of the city of Brest, France.

Prior to 20th century

 1060s – Moat dug around the Château de Brest (approximate date).
 1240 - Ceded by a count of Léon to John I, Duke of Brittany
 14th C. – Tour Tanguy built (approximate date).
 1342 – 18 August: Battle of Brest (1342).
 1386 - Siege of Brest (1386)
 16th C. Château de Brest construction concluded.
 1512 – 10 August: Naval Battle of Saint-Mathieu occurs offshore.
 1631 - Richelieu constructed a harbour with wooden wharves.
 1680/88 - Sébastien Le Prestre de Vauban fortified the harbour.
 1694 - (18 June) Battle of Camaret, an English squadron under John Berkeley, 3rd Baron Berkeley of Stratton, was miserably defeated.
 1702 –  consecrated.
 1749 – Saint-Sauveur Church built in Recouvrance.
 1751 – Brest Prison built.
 1752 – Académie de Marine founded.
 1783 – Questel Fort built.
 1784 – Fort Montbarey built.
 1793
 2 January: Childers Incident occurs in the Goulet de Brest.
 Population: 24,180.
 1794 - French fleet, under Villaret de Joyeuse, was beaten by the English Richard Howe, 1st Earl Howe
 1805 –  built.
 1848
 Phare du Petit Minou and Phare du Portzic (lighthouses) built.
  (school) founded.
 1851 – Chamber of Commerce established.

 1858
 Nantes-Brest canal begins operating.
  founded.
 1861 – Pont National (swing-bridge) built.
 1865 – Paris–Brest railway begins operating.
 1876 – Population: 66,828.
 1882 – Société de géographie de Brest founded.
 1886
  newspaper begins publication.
 Population: 70,778.
 1898 – Brest tramway begins operating.

20th century

 1903 – Tramways Électrique du Finistère begins operating.
 1905 –  football club formed.
 1911 – Population: 90,540.
 1930 – Plougastel Bridge built near city.
 1932 – Gare de Brest built.
 1939 –  built.
 1940
  begins.
 Gegen Engeland German-language newspaper begins publication.
 1942 –  built in the Arsenal.
 1944
 August: Battle for Brest begins.
 9 September: .
 18 September: Germans ousted by Allied forces.
 1947
 28 July: .
  begins operating.
 1951 – Pont de l'Harteloire (bridge) built.
 1954
 Pont de Recouvrance (bridge) built.
  founded.
 1957 –  regional transit network created.
 1958 –  rebuilt.
 1959 –  becomes mayor.
 1970 – University of Western Brittany founded.
 1973 - Rïnkla Stadium built.
 1974 - Urban Community of Brest established.
 1975 - Population: 166,826.
 1976 –  in business.
 1982
 Pierre Maille becomes mayor.
 Brest becomes part of the Brittany (administrative region).
 1986 – Brest European Short Film Festival begins.
 1997 – Socialist Party national congress held in Brest.

21st century

 2001 –  becomes mayor.
 2012
 Brest tramway begins operating.
 Population: 141,315.
 2014 – Brest Arena built.
 2016 –  begins operating.
 2017 – , a mall and cultural venue, opens.

See also
 Brest history
 
 
 

other cities in the Brittany region
 Timeline of Rennes

References

This article incorporates information from the French Wikipedia.

Bibliography

in English

in French

External links

 Items related to Brest, various dates (via Europeana).
 Items related to Brest, various dates (via Digital Public Library of America).

 
brest